Epischnia adultella is a species of snout moth in the genus Epischnia. It was described by Philipp Christoph Zeller in 1848 and is known from Russia, Mongolia, France, Italy and Greece.

The wingspan is about 25 mm.

References

Moths described in 1848
Phycitini
Moths of Europe